Probe Launch Complex C or PLC-C at the Vandenberg Space Force Base in California, United States, is a launch complex which was used for six sounding rocket launches between 1971 and 1975. It was originally built as Launch Complex C or LC-C at the Point Arguello Naval Air Station, however no launches were made from the site whilst it was part of Point Arguello. Following the merger of Point Arguello into Vandenberg in 1964, it was briefly designated PALC-C, and subsequently Probe Launch Complex C.

Launch history 
Six launches occurred from Probe Launch Complex C. The first four launches used Aerobee-170 rockets, whilst the last two used Tomahawks. Five of the launches reached space, with the exception of the third Aerobee, which failed early in its flight. The Aerobee launches conducted tests of infrared sensors for anti-ballistic missile systems, whilst the Tomahawks were used for aeronomy research.

References 

Probe Launch Complex C